Paul Ernst Fackenheim (born 1892) was a  German Jewish Army lieutenant who fought in World War I and received the Iron Cross 1st and 2nd class.

In 1939 he was detained and transferred to Dachau concentration camp; he was prisoner number 26336.

In 1941 Fackenheim was recruited by the Abwehr to serve as a spy; the German Military Intelligence Service appealed to his officer's sense of honour to serve his country once again as a spy in Palestine. His job as a spy in the Middle East lasted only a few days; he was detained and interrogated by the British, who kept him in captivity until 1946.

He survived the war as one of the few Jews to be freed from an extermination camp by the German authorities and returned to Germany, settling in Henstedt-Ulzburg

Michael Bar-Zohar wrote his biography, titled in English "Hitler's Jewish Spy"

References 

http://www.nytimes.com/1985/12/29/books/the-jew-who-spied-for-th-nazis.html
http://www.renewamerica.com/columns/sharpe/111208
http://www.nationalarchives.gov.uk/catalogue/displaycataloguedetails.asp?CATLN=6&CATID=8331692&SearchInit=4&SearchType=6&CATREF=KV+2%2F1163

1892 births
Abwehr
Dachau concentration camp survivors
German Jewish military personnel of World War I
Year of death missing
Recipients of the Iron Cross (1914), 1st class